This is a list of members of the Western Australian Legislative Assembly from 1996 to 2001:

 On 15 February 2000, the Labor member for Pilbara, Larry Graham, left the party to serve as an Independent after losing preselection to recontest his seat at the 2001 state election. He defeated the endorsed Labor candidate at the election.

References
 Western Australian Electoral Commission https://archive.today/20020224153132/http://www.waec.wa.gov.au/frames.asp?section=state&content=96elected.htm

Members of Western Australian parliaments by term